

165001–165100 

|-id=067
| 165067 Pauls ||  || A. Georg Pauls (born 1958), engineer with the Sloan Digital Sky Survey || 
|}

165101–165200 

|-id=192
| 165192 Neugent ||  || Kathryn F. Neugent (born 1987), research associate at Lowell Observatory and computer scientist at the National Renewable Energy Laboratory Src || 
|}

165201–165300 

|-bgcolor=#f2f2f2
| colspan=4 align=center | 
|}

165301–165400 

|-id=347
| 165347 Philplait ||  || Phil Plait (born 1964), American astronomer, educator and author || 
|}

165401–165500 

|-bgcolor=#f2f2f2
| colspan=4 align=center | 
|}

165501–165600 

|-id=574
| 165574 Deidre ||  || Deidre Ann Hunter (born 1953), astronomer at Lowell Observatory || 
|}

165601–165700 

|-id=612
| 165612 Stackpole ||  || Michael Stackpole (born 1957), American science fiction author and science advocate || 
|-id=659
| 165659 Michaelhicks ||  || Michael D. Hicks (born 1964), scientist at the Jet Propulsion Laboratory || 
|}

165701–165800 

|-bgcolor=#f2f2f2
| colspan=4 align=center | 
|}

165801–165900 

|-bgcolor=#f2f2f2
| colspan=4 align=center | 
|}

165901–166000 

|-bgcolor=#f2f2f2
| colspan=4 align=center | 
|}

References 

165001-166000